Erin Henderson (born July 1, 1986) is a former American football inside linebacker that played nine seasons in National Football League (NFL). He is currently an assistant linebackers coach at Avila University. He was signed by the Minnesota Vikings as an undrafted free agent in 2008. He played college football at Maryland.

Early years
Henderson was born and raised in Aberdeen, Maryland. He played quarterback and linebacker for Aberdeen High School in Harford County, Maryland and won the first state football championship in school history.

College career
After redshirting his freshman year with the Terrapins, Henderson missed the entire 2005 season after tearing his left anterior cruciate ligament.

Henderson entered his redshirt sophomore year in 2006 at Maryland and started 12 of 13 games at linebacker. Henderson finished the season with 114 total tackles, 1 sack, 3 forced fumbles, and 2 interceptions.  Henderson returned an interception for a TD in a close 28-26 victory at Virginia on October 14, 2006. Henderson had a season high 17 total tackles at Clemson on April 11, 2006. He earned second-team all-ACC honors while finishing 2nd in the conference in total tackles.

As a redshirt junior in 2007, Henderson recorded 133 total tackles, a forced fumble, 4 fumble recoveries, and an interception.  Henderson had a season high and career high 18 total tackles versus Virginia on October 20, 2007. Henderson was a semi-finalist for the Dick Butkus Award, which went to James Laurinaitis of Ohio State. He led a 6–6 Maryland squad to the 2007 Emerald Bowl, where they lost to Oregon State.

Professional playing career

Minnesota Vikings
During his rookie year, he played in 10 games and finished with 15 tackles. He mostly played on special teams and saw limited time on defense.

Henderson played in two regular season games for the Vikings in 2009, recording four tackles. He was suspended four games by the NFL on December 15, 2009, for violation of league's banned substances policy. Henderson won the starting job at weak-side linebacker at the start of the 2011 season.

Set to become an unrestricted free agent for the 2013 season, Henderson re-signed with the Vikings for a two-year contract. In the first regular-season game of 2013 against the Lions, Henderson recorded his first interceptions and got 11 tackles and 1 pass deflection.

He was released from the Vikings on February 7, 2014, after two suspected DUI arrests.

New York Jets
After being out of the league in 2014, Henderson signed with the New York Jets on April 8, 2015. On March 23, 2016, the Jets signed Henderson to a two-year contract for $3.1 million. On October 22, 2016, he was placed on the Reserve/Non Football Illness list.

On February 25, 2017, the Jets declined Henderson's option, making him a free agent.

After football
Henderson became a substitute eighth-grade math teacher. He also volunteered as an assistant football coach at his former high school, Aberdeen.

Professional coaching career
In 2019, Henderson became an assistant linebackers coach for Avila University.

Personal life
In March 2012, Henderson married his longtime girlfriend Maleah Flint in an elaborate ceremony in Atlanta, GA. Together they share their only child, a son named Lennox. Henderson is the younger brother of former linebacker E. J. Henderson. They both played college football at Maryland.

Henderson was arrested on suspicion of DUI in November 2013 and again January 1, 2014.

Henderson was charged with a DWI and possession of ten grams of marijuana on February 27, 2014, after being released from the Vikings earlier that month. On May 7, 2014, he was sentenced to two years of probation after he pleaded guilty to the latter DWI charge.

Lawsuit
On September 29, 2017, it was announced that Henderson filed a lawsuit against the New York Jets for failing to accommodate his disability with his bipolar disorder and wrongful termination, which cost him more than $3 million.

References

External links
Maryland Terrapins bio
Minnesota Vikings bio

1986 births
Living people
People from Aberdeen, Maryland
Players of American football from Maryland
American football linebackers
Maryland Terrapins football players
Minnesota Vikings players
New York Jets players